Baedeker Guides are travel guide books published by the Karl Baedeker firm of Germany beginning in the 1830s.

List of Baedeker guides by year of publication

1850s (in German)

1860s
 
 
 
 
 
 
 
 
 .
 . 
 
 Part 2 (Central Italy and Rome)
  (or )

1870s

1871

 .

1872
 . 
 
 
 Part 3 (Southern Italy and Sicily)
 .
 .

1873
 . 
 
 
 
 
 
 
 .

1874
 .

1875
 .
 .

1876
 . 
 
 
 
 .

1877
 .
 .

1878
 .
 . 
 
 .
 .
 .

1879
 
 .
 
 .

1880s

1880
 .

1881
 
 .
 .
 .

1882

1883
 
 . 
 
 
 Part 3 (Southern Italy and Sicily, with Excursions into the Liparia Islands, Malta, Sardinia, Tunis, and Corfu )

1884
 
 .
 .

1885

1886
 . 
 
 
 
 .

1887
 
 
 .

1888

 
 
 .

1889

 
 
 
 
 
 .

1890s

1890

 
 . 
 
 
 
 .

1891
 
 
 .
 
 .
 .

1892

1893
 . 
 
 
 
 .
 .

1894
 
 .
 
 
 
 
 .
 .

1895
 
 Egypt edited by K. Baedeker, Part First: Lower Egypt, with the Fayum and the Peninsula of Sinai, Leipsic: Karl Baedeker, 1895
 .
 
 
 
 .

1896
 
 
 . 
 Part 1 (Northern Italy, including Leghorn, Florence, Ravenna, and routes through Switzerland and Austria)
 
 
 
 .

1897
 
 
 .
 .

1898
 .
 
 
 .

1899
 
 
 .
 
 .

1900s

1900
 
 .
 . 
 
 
 
 .

1901
 
 
 
 .

1902

1903
 
 
 . 
 Part 1 (Northern Italy, including Leghorn, Florence, Ravenna, and routes through Switzerland and Austria)
 
 
 
 .

1904
 .
 .

1905
  + Index
 
 
 
 
 .

1906
 
 .

1907
 .
 
 .
 
 .

1908
 
 
 
  + index
 Southern Italy and Sicily, with excursions to Malta, Sardinia, Tunis and Corfu (15th ed.), Leipzig: Karl Baedeker, 1908

1909
 
 
 
 Northern France, from Belgium and the English Channel to the Loire, excluding Paris and its environs (15th ed.), Leipzig, Karl Baedeker, 1909
 
 .
  + Index

1910s
 
  + Index
 
  +  Index
 
  + Index
 
  + index
 
 
 
  + Index
 
 Berlin un Umgebung, 1910, Karl Baedeker

1920s

1930s

 
 
 
 
 
 
 Note: the 15 editions before this were published as Belgium and Holland

1940s

No English Baedekers published.

The first post-World War II old-style Baedekers in English were published in the 1950s by Karl Baedeker Verlag, Hamburg, after the firm was revived in 1948.

1950s

1960s

1970s

List of Baedeker guides by geographic coverage

With a few exceptions, classic Baedekers were published in German, English and French. These lists enlist the English Baedekers only. Where geographical areas were not covered in English editions this is indicated.

Alaska

See Canada and United States

Alaska became the 49th state of the United States on January 3, 1959.

Albania
 In German only: Dalmatia, Western Yugoslavia, Albania viz. Dalmatien und die Adria, Westliches Südslawien, Istrien, Budapest, Albanien, Korfu. Karl Baedeker, Leipzig, 1929.

Algeria
See Mediterranean

Andorra

See Spain

Austria
 
 
 
 
 
 .
 .
 
 
 .
 
 
 
  + Index
  + index
 
  +  Index

Belgium 
 .
 .
 .
 .
 
 
 
 
 
 
 
 
 
  + via HathiTrust

Bosnia and Herzegovina

See Austria

Burma
See India (Indien).

Canada
 .
 .
 .

Ceylon
See India (Indien).

China
See Russia for Peking.

Croatia
Austria-Hungary including Dalmatia, Bosnia, Bucharest, Belgrade, and Montenegro (10th ed. 1905) and (11th ed. 1911), Karl Baedeker, Leipzig.

Cuba
See United States

Czechoslovakia
See Austria

Cyprus
See Turkey and Palestine

Denmark
See Norway

Egypt
 . 
 
 
 
 
 .
 
 
  + Index

Estonia
See Russia.

Finland
In German title only; Schweden, Finnland und die Hauptreisewege durch Dänemark, Karl Baedeker, Leipzig, 1929

See also Russia

France 
 
 .
 
 
 
 
 
 
  + Index
  + via HathiTrust

 
  + via Internet Archive

Germany
1870s-1880s
 
  + index
 
 
 .
 .
 
 .
 
 
 .
 .
 
 
 

1890s-1900s
 .
 .
 
 .
 
 
 .
 
 
 
 

1910s-1920s
  + index
 Berlin und Umgebung, 1910, Karl Baedeker

  + Index

  + Index

 
 
 

1930s-1950s

Gibraltar

See Spain

Great Britain
 
 
 
 
 
 
 
 
 
 
 
 
 
  + Index
 
  + index

Greece

Hungary
See Austria

Iceland
See Norway

India
In German only:  (including Ceylon, Burma, Siam, parts of Malaya, Java; 1st ed.).

In 2013, Michael Wild, the Baedeker historian (see Karl Baedeker), published his translation of the 1914 Indien edition into English.

Indonesia
See India (Indien) for Java.

Iran
See Russia for Teheran.

Iraq
See Palestine for Babylonia.

Ireland
Ireland appeared only in the German editions of Great Britain viz. Grossbritannien (4th and last ed.), Karl Baedeker, Leipzig, 1906.

Isle of Man
See Great Britain, in particular:

 Great Britain (7th ed.), Leipzig: Karl Baedeker, 1910 
 
 Great Britain (8th ed.), Leipzig: Karl Baedeker, Leipzig, 1927

 Great Britain (9th ed.), Leipzig: Karl Baedeker, 1937

Italy 
 
 
 
 
 . 
 
 Part 2 (Central Italy and Rome)
  (or )
 . 
 
 
 Part 3 (Southern Italy and Sicily)
 . 
 
 
 . 
 
 
 . 
 
 
 . 
 
 
 . 
 
 
 Part 3 (Southern Italy and Sicily, with Excursions into the Liparia Islands, Malta, Sardinia, Tunis, and Corfu )
 . 
 
 
 . 
 
 
 
 . 
 
 
 . 
 
 
 . 
 
 
 . 
 
 
 .
  (+ Index)
 
 Southern Italy and Sicily, with excursions to Malta, Sardinia, Tunis and Corfu (15th ed.), Leipzig: Karl Baedeker, 1908 
  (+ via HathiTrust)
  (+ via HathiTrust; Index)

Jordan
See Palestine for Petra.

Latvia
See Russia.

Lebanon
See Palestine

Libya
See Italy (Southern) and Palestine

Liechtenstein

 Tyrol and the Dolomites (13th ed.), Leipzig, Karl Baedeker, 1927
 Switzerland (28th ed.), Leipzig, Karl Baedeker, 1938
 Only passing references to Vaduz in most of the other Switzerland editions.

Lithuania
See Russia.

Luxembourg
See Belgium

Madeira
 Madeira, Kanarische Inseln, Azoren, Westküste von Marokko (1st ed.), Leipzig: Karl Baedeker, 1934 (only German edition).
 
 Madeira, Canary Islands, Azores, Western Morocco (1st ed.), Leipzig: Karl Baedeker, 1939 (only English edition).

Malaya
See India (Indien).

Malta
See Italy (Southern)

Mediterranean
  + index

Mexico
See United States

Monaco

See France (Southern France editions)

Montenegro
 Austria-Hungary including Dalmatia, Bosnia, Bucharest, Belgrade, and Montenegro (10th ed. 1905) and (11th ed. 1911), Karl Baedeker, Leipzig.

Morocco
See Mediterranean

Netherlands 
See Belgium

Norway
 
 
 
 
 
 .
 .
 
 
  + Index

Palestine
 .
 .
 
 .
  (Index)

Poland

See Russia and Germany

Portugal 
See Spain

Romania
 Austria-Hungary including Dalmatia, Bosnia, Bucharest, Belgrade, and Montenegro (10th ed. 1905) and (11th ed. 1911), Karl Baedeker, Leipzig

Russia
 
 . (Index).

San Marino
See Italy *Rome and Central Italy.

Serbia
See Yugoslavia

Siam (Thailand)
See India (Indien).

Slovenia
See Croatia

Spain 
 
 
  + index
  + index

Sudan
See Palestine

Sweden
See Norway

Switzerland 
 
 
 .
 .
 .
 .
 .
 .
 .
 .
 .
 .
 .
 .
 .
 .
 .
 .
 .
 .

Syria
See Palestine

Trans-Siberian Railway
See Russia (1st ed, 1914), Karl Baedeker, Leipzig.

Tunisia
See Mediterranean

Turkey
 In German only: Constantinople and Asia Minor viz. Konstantinopel und Kleinasien, Karl Baedeker, Leipzig, 1905
 In German only: Constantinople and Asia Minor viz. Konstantinopel und Kleinasien, Balkanstaaten, Archipel, Cypern (2nd ed.), Karl Baedeker, Leipzig, 1914
 In 2015, Michael Wild, the Baedeker chronicler, published his translation into English of the 1914 Konstantinopel edition in German.

 Also see Mediterranean - only English edition with Constantinople.

United States
 
 
 . Index

Yugoslavia
 In German only: Dalmatia, Western Yugoslavia, Albania viz. Dalmatien und die Adria, Westliches Südslawien, Istrien, Budapest, Albanien, Korfu , Karl Baedeker, Leipzig, 1929.
 Austria-Hungary including Dalmatia, Bosnia, Bucharest, Belgrade, and Montenegro (10th ed. 1905) and (11th ed. 1911), Karl Baedeker, Leipzig.

See also
 Karl Baedeker - the founder of Verlag Baedeker, the Baedeker publishing firm.
 Baedeker - for the history of the House of Baedeker.

References

Further reading

External links
 BDKR On-line catalogue to all guides with English translations of parts of Hinrichsen's book.
 

Travel guide books
Series of books
Publications established in the 1830s